The  Little Mashel River Waterfalls are the 3 waterfalls contained within the gorge of the Little Mashel River, not far above its confluence with the Mashel River.

Tom Tom Falls 

The river flows over an old dam, an artifact of an old millpond, before narrowing and plunging about 25 feet over a cliff into a pool below. The falls are only 5 feet wide, so they are quite powerful.

Little Mashel Falls 

Little Mashel Falls occurs where the river slides down roughly  into a congregation of boulders. In spring when the river is high, the falls are thunderous and generate a lot of spray. In the summer, one can actually walk behind the falls as the river and falls have less flow. Getting down to the base of the falls as well as the brink is easily possible, but extreme caution should be used since the rocks are very slippery, especially in high water, and many people have died in falls from the lip of the falls.

Lower Little Mashel Falls 

It is the only waterfall in the Little Mashel gorge with no official name. Caution should be used when using the trail to the falls’ base since it is overgrown, steep, and muddy.

References 

Waterfalls of Pierce County, Washington
Waterfalls of Washington (state)